Honrarás a los tuyos is a Mexican telenovela produced by Televisa and originally transmitted by Telesistema Mexicano.

Cast 
 Dalia Íñiguez
 Carlos Agostí
 Pilar Pellicer
 Nelida Ponse

References 

Mexican telenovelas
Televisa telenovelas
1959 telenovelas
1959 Mexican television series debuts
1959 Mexican television series endings
Spanish-language telenovelas